The National Lottery is the state-franchised national lottery established in 1994 in the United Kingdom. It is regulated by the Gambling Commission, and is currently operated by Camelot Group, to which the licence was granted in 1994, 2001 and again in 2007, but will be operated by Allwyn Entertainment Ltd from 2024.

Prizes are paid as a lump sum (with the exception of the Set For Life which is paid over a set period) and are tax-free. Of all money spent on National Lottery games, around 53% goes to the prize fund and 25% to "good causes" as set out by Parliament (though some of this is considered by some to be a form of "stealth tax" levied to support the National Lottery Community Fund, a fund constituted to support public spending). 12% goes to the UK Government as lottery duty, 4% to retailers as commission, and a total of 5% to operator Camelot, with 4% to cover operating costs and 1% as profit.

Since 22 April 2021, players must be 18 years of age to purchase lottery tickets and scratchcards (online and in-store).

History

Background 
A statute of 1698 provided that in England lotteries were by default illegal unless specifically authorised by statute.   State lotteries were established by the Bank of England to generate money for 'good causes' and also to enable Britain to go to war.   Early English state lotteries included the Million Lottery (1694) and the Malt Lottery (1697).

A 1934 Act, further liberalised in 1956 and 1976, legalised small lotteries.

20th century 

A National Health Service Lottery was piloted in 1988 but cancelled for legal reasons before the first draw.

The UK's state-franchised lottery was set up under government licence by the government of John Major in 1993. The National Lottery is franchised to a private operator; the Camelot Group was awarded the franchise on 25 May 1994.

The first draw took place on 19 November 1994 with a television programme presented by Noel Edmonds. The first numbers drawn were 30, 3, 5, 44, 14 and 22, the bonus was 10, and seven jackpot winners shared a prize of £5,874,778.

Tickets became available on the Isle of Man on 2 December 1999 at the request of Tynwald.

A second lottery draw, Thunderball, was introduced by Camelot on 12 June 1999.

21st century 
The National Lottery undertook a major rebranding programme in May 2002, designed to combat falling sales. The main game was renamed Lotto, and Lottery Extra became Lotto Extra, though Camelot would later retire Lotto Extra on 8 July 2006 due to low sales. The stylised crossed-fingers logo was modified. However, the games as a collective are still known as the National Lottery. It is one of the most popular forms of gambling in the United Kingdom.

Originally, the draw machines for Lotto and Lotto Extra were the Criterion model, manufactured by Smartplay International Inc., but on 25 October 2003, Camelot replaced them with Smartplay's Magnum I model. These machines were called Topaz, Sapphire, Amethyst, Opal, Garnet & Moonstone, while the older Criterion machines from 1994 were called Merlin, Arthur, Lancelot & Guinevere, with the addition of Vyvyan & Galahad in 2000. On 21 November 2009, Camelot replaced its older Lotto draw machines again. The new machines have the same names of those used on earlier machines, except Vyvyan & Galahad. On 9 May 2010, new machines for the Thunderball game were introduced, replacing Smartplay's older Halogen I model that had been in use since 1999, following the major rule changes on Thunderball. The current Lotto machines are the Smartplay Magnum II model, and the current Thunderball and Set For Life machines are the Smartplay Halogen II model. The Thunderball & Set for Life machines are all named Excalibur, named after King Arthur's sword.

On 16 March 2018, Camelot advised more than 10 million players with online accounts to change their passwords because of a "low-level" cyber attack that affected 150 customer accounts. They claim that no money was taken from customers. Camelot claimed the hackers used a method called credential stuffing and said the attack appeared to have begun on 7 March.

Eligibility 
, the eligibility requirements include:
 Players must be at least 18 years old to buy scratchcards or to play Lotto, Thunderball, EuroMillions or Set For Life.
 Tickets may be bought in person at approved premises in the UK, or online.
 Online purchase of tickets from the National Lottery website is restricted to people who have a UK bank account (for debit card or direct debit purposes), are resident in the UK or Isle of Man, and are physically present in the UK or Isle of Man when making the ticket purchase.
 The ticket purchaser for a syndicate, typically its manager, must meet the eligibility criteria for ticket purchase. Syndicate members must be aged 18 or over.
 Lottery tickets are not transferable, so commercial syndicates (i.e. where extra charges are levied over and above the total face value of the tickets purchased) are not permitted.
From introduction in November 1994 until April 2021, lottery tickets could be purchased by people at least 16 years old. Scratchcards, from introduction in March 1995 to April 2021, could also be purchased by people at least 16 years old.

Games 

Several games operate under the National Lottery brand:

Current games 

, the current games include:

Lotto 

Players buy tickets with their choice of six different numbers between 1 and 59; there is provision for random numbers to be generated automatically for those who do not wish to choose, known as a 'Lucky Dip'. The entry fee to the Lotto draw was set at £1 per board from its introduction, and increased to £2 in October 2013.

The draw is conducted twice a week on Wednesdays and Saturdays, except that, between 1994 and 2009, a draw on Christmas Day was moved to Christmas Eve; since 2010, draws are held on Christmas Day if that was a Wednesday or Saturday. Saturday draws started on 19 November 1994, under the name 'National Lottery'; the first Wednesday draw was on 5 February 1997. All of the draws are shown live on their YouTube channel at 20:00 on Wednesdays, and at 19:45 on Saturdays.

Lotto was originally called The National Lottery, but was renamed Lotto in an update in May 2002 after ticket sales decreased. Lotto is by far the most popular draw, with around 15 to 45 million tickets sold each draw. The most winners for a single jackpot was 133 in January 1995, each player winning £122,510.

In the draw, six numbered balls are drawn without replacement from a set of 59 balls numbered from 1 to 59 (formerly 1 to 49 until October 2015). A further Bonus Ball is also drawn, which affects only players who match five numbers.

There are six prize tiers, which are awarded to players who match at least two of the six drawn numbers, with prizes increasing for matching more of the drawn numbers. The players who match all six drawn numbers win equal shares of the jackpot; the chance of doing so is 1 in 45,057,474. Similarly, if four or five balls are matched, the relevant prize is divided equally between all who match that many balls.

If no player matches all six numbers, the jackpot is added to that of the next Lotto draw—a rollover. This accumulation was limited to three consecutive draws until 10 February 2011, when it was increased to four. Rollovers are frequent, with for example 20 Wednesday (39%) and 13 Saturday rollovers (25%) in 2011 (fewer tickets are sold on Wednesdays than Saturdays, increasing the probability of a rollover). "Treble rollovers"—two consecutive rollovers—are much less common. The first quadruple rollover draw occurred on Saturday 29 September 2012 with a jackpot of £19.5 million. In the event of a quadruple rollover, if no tickets matched all six main numbers, the jackpot was shared between the tickets that match five numbers and the bonus ball. In October 2015, this rollover limit was replaced by a jackpot cap.

Lotto Golden Jubilee Draw 
On 1 June 2002, Camelot had introduced a special one-off jackpot only draw to celebrate the Golden Jubilee of HM Queen Elizabeth II. This bonus draw was included in the main Lotto game and gave players another chance at winning the jackpot on their Lotto ticket, using the same six numbers entered into the main draw. The rules were the same as Lotto Extra where players must match all six numbers to win the jackpot. Whilst the estimated jackpot for the main Lotto draw that evening was £6,600,000, the estimated jackpot for the Lotto Golden Jubilee Draw was £10,000,000.

October 2013 changes 
Camelot announced that the ticket price was to double to £2 from 3 October 2013, with prizes restructured. The announcement was followed by news that large bonuses were to be set aside for management pay, which drew criticism.

The arrival of the "New Lotto" meant bigger jackpots with an estimated average of £1.1 million extra for Saturday's draw and £400,000 on Wednesday. Players matching three numbers receive an extra £15, up from £10 before and an extra £40 for matching 4 numbers. Those matching five numbers receive £500 less, and £50,000 less when matching five numbers + the bonus ball, compared to the former system.

As part of the refresh, a new Lotto Raffle was introduced, with at least 50 winners of £20,000 per draw. The announcement and launch of the refreshed Lotto game caused controversy due to the price increase (dubbed as a "tax on the poor"). The new game launched with a £10,000,000 jackpot and 1,000 Lotto Raffle winners of £20,000.

October 2015 changes 
From 10 October 2015, Camelot announced further changes to the Lotto game which increased the pool of numbers from 49 to 59. Rollovers are no longer limited in number, instead the size of the jackpot is capped; the cap is reached after about 14 rollovers. When the jackpot gets to £50 million, if no-one matches all six main numbers the jackpot will rollover to the following draw. In the event nobody matches all six numbers on that draw the jackpot "rolls down" and is combined with the prize fund for the next prize category where there is at least one winner.

Since the rule changes in October 2015 there is also a "match 2" prize of a free lucky dip ticket for another draw, with odds of doing so at 1 in 10. This created much criticism as the breakdown of prizes announced by Camelot includes the value of these prizes (£2 each winner) within the draw's prize fund even though each match 2 prize winner does not see any monetary value unless their ticket matches three main numbers or more in the following draw. Included with each Lotto ticket is the Millionaire Lotto Raffle where 20 players win £20,000 each and one player wins £1 million per draw.

January 2016 changes 
In January 2016, the Lotto jackpot reached the £50 million cap and rolled over once more to reach a record-breaking £66 million. This was won by two ticket holders who received £33 million each. In August of that year, the jackpot cap was lowered to £22 million. If nobody won the jackpot when it reached £22 million or more, it would roll to the next draw one final time. Then, the jackpot must be won: if no-one matched all six main numbers, the jackpot prize was be shared by the players with the most winning numbers.

From October 2015 until October 2018, the total prize fund was 47.50% of draw sales in a normal week, including the raffle. The three-ball prize winners, with odds of 96 to 1, received £25 each; the two-ball prize winners received a free £2 entry. 17.82% of the sales are divided as shown in the table and split equally with the number of winners for each selection. In October 2018 the Lotto Raffle was discontinued.

November 2018 changes 
Wednesday 21 November 2018 brought significant changes. Ever since the game's inception, all prizes levels from "match 4" and above varied depending on the number of winners at each level and on total ticket sales. From this date, each prize level is a fixed amount per winner, similar to the Thunderball, and Set For Life draws. For the changes to be made possible, the Lotto Millionaire raffle was discontinued. The ticket price of £2 and number pool (1–59) remain the same.

Rollovers are limited to five. If nobody matches all six main numbers after the fifth rollover, the jackpot is shared between every prize winner including match 2 winners from October 2020. This is called a "Jackpot Rolldown". Every cash prize therefore increases substantially.(estimated amounts shown in brackets).

Expected jackpots: £3.8m minimum on Saturday and £2.0m minimum on Wednesday.

Lotto Event Draws.
All prize levels have a fixed prize amount. Due to this payout structure on occasion there will be a larger allocated prize fund than required to pay out all winners. This additional prize money is then placed into a reserve fund which is used when additional winners have winning matches. Once this surplus amount reaches a specified value a special event "must be won" draw is offered usually with a jackpot of £15-£20million.(rolling down if no match 6 winner). On Saturday 24 August 2019, Camelot also run a "double prize" event. All cash prizes were doubled although this has not been repeated since.

Lotto Hotpicks 

Lotto Hotpicks uses the main Lotto draw for its numbers but is a different game. The player chooses both the numbers and the number of draw balls they want to try to match, up to a maximum of five. However, if the player does not match all the numbers chosen, they are not a winner. The National Lottery describes Hotpicks as "five games in one", because the player has a choice of five ways of playing the game, each offering different odds and payouts.

Prior to 2015 (49 numbers) Prizes were 1 number = £5, 2  Numbers = £40, 3 Numbers = £450, 4 Numbers £7,000, 5 Numbers = £130,000. At launch, Match 1 & Match 5 were not available. These 2 options were added at a later date.

The entry fee to the Lotto Hotpicks draw is £1.00 per board.

Thunderball 
The Thunderball jackpot draw requires players to pick five main numbers from 1 to 39 and one 'Thunderball' number from 1 to 14 for an entry fee of £1 per line. Prizes are won by matching the Thunderball number or at least three main numbers alone. The more numbers matched, the bigger the prize won. The top prize, now £500,000, is won by matching all five main numbers as well as the Thunderball. The lowest prize is £3 for matching the Thunderball alone. Draws take place four times a week – Tuesdays, Wednesdays, Fridays and Saturdays – and are shown live on the official website and on their YouTube channel at 20:15.

The first Thunderball draw was held on 12 June 1999 and the draw was originally only held on Saturdays, however, from 23 October 2002, the draw was held on Wednesdays too. From 2006 to 2008, only the Saturday draw was televised, while on Wednesday the draw took place prior to the live TV show and the winning results were announced during the show.

The rules of Thunderball changed substantially on 9 May 2010. Before this date, Thunderball matches were drawn from numbers 1 to 34; there was no prize for matching the Thunderball number alone, and the top prize (for matching five main numbers and the Thunderball) was half the current jackpot at £250,000. After this date, the Friday draw was introduced in addition to the Wednesday and Saturday draws. Following the change of rules, while the chance of winning anything on Thunderball more than doubled, the chance of winning the top prizes more than halved. The Tuesday draw was added on 30 January 2018.

The odds and payouts are as follows:

Set For Life 
On 18 March 2019, the first Set For Life draw took place. The game offers a top prize of £10,000 per month for thirty years (£3,600,000). Each line costs £1.50, and draws take place every Monday and Thursday at 20:00. Players choose five main numbers from 1 to 47, and one "Life Ball" from 1 to 10.

EuroMillions 

On Saturday 7 February 2004 the lottery operator Camelot launched a pan-European lottery: EuroMillions. The first draw took place on Friday 13 February 2004 in Paris. The UK, France and Spain were involved initially. Lotteries from Austria, Belgium, Ireland, Luxembourg, Portugal and Switzerland joined the draw on 8 October 2004. The draws are currently made in Paris and shown recorded in the UK on the official website twice a week on Tuesdays and Fridays, approximately three hours after the draw has taken place. The entry fee to the EuroMillions draw is £2.50 per board. The odds of winning the jackpot are 139,838,160 to 1.

EuroMillions HotPicks 
On Friday 26 January 2018, the first EuroMillions HotPicks draw took place. It uses the same five main numbers as the EuroMillions draw and offers players the chance to win one of five prizes from £10 up to £1 million. The game works in a similar way to Lotto HotPicks whereby players have to decide how many numbers they are going to match. If they do not successfully match all of their selected numbers, then no prize is awarded.

Scratchcards 
As well as tickets for the draw games, the National Lottery also sells scratchcards. Introduced in 1995, they are small pieces of card where an area has been covered by a thin layer of opaque latex that can be scratched off. Under this are concealed the items/pictures that must be found in order to win. Scratchcards can be purchased in most newsagents and supermarkets; they can cost £1, £2, £3 or £5 and come in many different forms, with a variety of prizes and ways to win.

The National Lottery used to offer £10 scratchcards but these were discontinued in September 2019, partly because they were attractive to problem gamblers.

The generic scratchcard requires the player to match three of the same prize amounts. If this is accomplished, they win that amount; the highest  being £2,000,000 on a £5 scratchcard. Other scratchcards involve matching symbols, pictures or words.

Initially, all scratchcards were sold for £1. Over the years, scratchcards that range in price from £2 to £10 have been available. More expensive scratchcards are larger and offer more games with higher-value prizes. Some scratchcards have jackpots other than one-off payments, such as a yearly sum or a car. Odds for winning a top prize on a scratchcard depend greatly on how many have been sold and whether there is any top prize scratchcards in circulation at time of purchase. As the range of scratchcard games has increased, the odds of winning vary greatly. For a game with the highest available jackpot of £4,000,000, the odds of winning the jackpot are around 1 in 4,000,000, whereas for a game with a low jackpot prize (and thousands of jackpots available), the odds of winning the jackpot are as low as around 1 in 10,000.

Online Instant Wins 
Instant Win games are online games where the player can win prizes instantly.  Some games are similar in format to scratchcards, with others involving more interactive play such as dice-rolling or matching special symbols. It is made clear that the Instant Win games are solely based on luck and that no skill or judgement is involved. Players must be registered in order to buy or try an Instant Win. "Try" games are free of charge and no payouts are made in respect of any prizes. As with scratchcards, there are a wide variety of Instant Win games available with different odds of winning prizes. The cost to play varies from 25p to £5. The current highest prize is £1 million on a £5 game.  Odds of winning a top prize vary on each Instant Win game, and may be higher or lower than their scratchcard counterpart.

UK Millionaire Maker 
Introduced in November 2009, each EuroMillions ticket purchased in the UK contains a unique "UK Millionaire Maker" code, consisting of four letters and five numbers. There is one winner per draw (with the exception of a special draw), with the winner receiving a fixed £1,000,000. Odds of winning depend on the number of tickets sold for that particular draw in the UK, but are generally 1 in 1,900,000 on Tuesdays and 1 in 2,950,000 on Fridays.

Discontinued games

Lotto Extra 

Lotto Extra was introduced on 13 November 2000 and was originally called Lottery Extra but renamed Lotto Extra in May 2002. It was an add-on from the main draw where a player could select "Lotto Extra same numbers" or a lucky dip. Players would pick six numbers from 49 and there were no lower tier prizes so a perfect match was required. The draw was originally televised on both Wednesdays and Saturdays, but after the introduction of Wednesday's Thunderball draw on 23 October 2002, only the Saturday draw was televised as the Wednesday draw took place prior to the live TV show, and the winning results for Lotto Extra on Wednesdays was shown after the main Lotto draw. Due to poor sales on the draw's last few years, the last draw was on 8 July 2006 and it was replaced by Dream Number.

Dream Number 

Dream Number was launched on 15 July 2006. It involved a random seven-digit number generated for entry into the main draw. It was played independently of Lotto, or if played with Lotto one Dream Number was generated per ticket, not per Lotto entry. The cost of entry was £1. A dream number was printed on every Lotto ticket bought, whether the player had chosen to enter it into the draw or not. Unlike other Lotto games, it was not possible to choose the number entered, and the order in which the digits were drawn was significant, as the digits had to be matched in the same order for the player to win. Players had to match with the first digit in order to start winning prizes (ranging from £2 to £500,000), which meant that 90% of players lost as soon as the first ball was drawn. Three Dream Number machines were made and were named Peridot, Tourmarine and Adventurine, and were custom made single digit air mix machines manufactured by Smartplay International Inc. Draws took place on Wednesdays and Saturdays. Originally, the draw was televised on both Wednesdays and Saturdays, but was latterly only televised on Saturdays, when the Wednesday draw took place prior to the live TV show and the winning dream number was announced during the show. All money raised for good causes from Dream Number went towards the 2012 Summer Olympics and 2012 Summer Paralympics in London. The National Lottery closed the Dream Number game on Wednesday 9 February 2011, which was also the date of the last Dream Number draw. It was then replaced by Lotto Plus 5.

Daily Play 

The Daily Play draw started on Monday 22 September 2003 and could be played every day except Sunday and Christmas Day. By selecting seven numbers between 1 and 27, players could win anything from a free lucky dip to £30,000. The draw gave its players the chance to win a free daily play lucky-dip for not matching any numbers in the draw. The entry fee to the Daily Play draw was £1 per board.

Daily Play draws were broadcast via a webcast.  In addition, from March 2005 to October 2005, the Daily Play draw was broadcast live on Challenge TV in the Glory Ball show, hosted by Jean Anderson, James McCourt, Jayne Sharp and Nikki Cowan.

The National Lottery Daily Play Draw ended for good on Friday 6th May 2011.

Lotto Plus 5 

Lotto Plus 5 was introduced in 2011 to plug the gaps between the Wednesday and Saturday Lotto draws, meaning it takes place on Mondays, Tuesdays, Thursdays, Fridays and Sundays. Players can enter by paying an extra £1 when buying their Lotto ticket, which enters the same ticket numbers into five separate draws. Each draw offers fixed prizes for matching 3, 4, 5 and 6 numbers, with the jackpot being worth £250,000. It has been estimated that the game produces an extra 500,000 Lotto winners every week. Due to the changes to the main Lotto game (most notably the introduction of the Lotto raffle), Plus 5 was discontinued; The last Plus 5 draw was played on Tuesday 1st October 2013, with the last date to buy a ticket being Monday 23rd September 2013.

Vernons Easy Play 

In August 1998, the National Lottery joined Vernons to create a lottery similar to the football pools. Players marked a playslip to state how many lines they wanted to play. Tickets were £1 per entry. The lottery terminal allocated 10 football fixtures on the player's ticket, and the player attempted to match these fixtures that resulted in a score draw (1–1, 2–2, 3–3 and so on).

To win, players had to match at least five fixtures which resulted in a score draw; this always won £5. Matching six won between £6 and £530, depending on how many total score draws there were in total over all the fixtures played. Matching seven score draws won between £27 and £67,000 depending on total score draws, and matching eight won from £1,850 to £667,000. Thus, the more score draws there were, the easier it was to win.

The game was not a success and was discontinued at the end of the 1998–9 football season, in April 1999.

Big Draw / Christmas Millionaire Maker 

Originally a special one-off draw, which was made to commemorate the arrival of the new millennium on 31 December 1999, but was brought back in 2000 to celebrate the next new year, and in 2001, 2002 and 2003 to celebrate Christmas on 24 December each year.

Players chose six years from 1900 to 1999 (in the Big Draw 2001 version, the range moved to 1901–2000, 1902–2001 in Christmas Millionaire Maker 2001, 1903–2002 in the 2002 version and 1904–2003 in the 2003 version) or a lucky dip on their Big Draw/Christmas Millionaire Maker ticket for the first game. Five years and a bonus year were drawn. If a player matched all five years drawn, they won the jackpot (lower prize tiers were also available for matching two to four years with/without the bonus year if the player did not match all five main years). Two years – one from 1000 to 1999 and another from 2000 to 2999 – were printed at the bottom of the ticket for the second game, and if the player matched both years on their Big Draw ticket they would win the jackpot.

One machine was used for the first game, but for the second game two pairs of machines were used: first a left machine with the numbers from 10 to 19, and a right machine with 00 to 99; secondly a left machine with 20 to 29, and again a right machine with 00 to 99. One number was drawn at random from each of those machines, each pair creating a year. Each ticket cost £5 per board.

Millionaire Raffle 

Camelot introduced the Lotto Raffle in October 2013, which was renamed Millionaire Raffle in October 2015. A raffle number was included with each line of Lotto numbers bought. Each raffle number consisted of a colour and eight numbers (e.g. AQUA 4579 2965), and each winning raffle number won a fixed amount of £20,000.

Until October 2015, 50 raffle numbers were drawn with each Lotto draw and the number of raffle winners increased by 50 each time the Lotto jackpot rolled over, with as many as 250 raffle winners in the event of a quadruple rollover. From 10 October 2015, the prize structure was changed, with 20 prizes of £20,000 and one prize of £1,000,000 with each Lotto draw. The Millionaire Raffle was discontinued after 17 November 2018 when the Lotto draw rules changed.

Other ways to play 
As well as in shops, tickets can be purchased online. After registering an account, players can play regular numbers by direct debit, or load their account with money and play as and when they choose. Winners are notified by email. 

Other ways to play have been discontinued:
 Until September 2009, Lotto and EuroMillions were available through Sky Active. Players could purchase up to eight weeks' worth of tickets at a time.
 From October 2004 to 30 June 2013, it was possible to play by text.
 From July 2015, lucky dip tickets could be purchased through Barclays' Pingit app. Pingit was discontinued on 30 June 2021.

Olympic Lottery 
Following the success of London's bid to host the 2012 Summer Olympics, Olympic Lottery Scratchcards were launched on 27 July 2005 under the brand name "Go for Gold". 28% of the price of £1 went to the Olympic Lottery Distribution Fund, and the scratchcards were intended to raise £750,000,000 towards the cost of staging the games.

On television 

The majority of National Lottery draws take place on live television. The first National Lottery show (entitled The National Lottery Live: The First Draw) was at 7 pm on Saturday 19 November 1994. Presented by Noel Edmonds, this was an hour long special, in which 49 contestants competed to become the first person to start the draw, the winner being 18-year-old Deborah Walsh. The first number to be drawn was 30. For its first few years, the TV show took the title The National Lottery Live, and was presented mainly by Anthea Turner or Bob Monkhouse. Other notable presenters during this period included Dale Winton, Carol Smillie, Terry Wogan and Ulrika Jonsson. On 30 November 1996, live on BBC One, the draw machine failed to start.

During the 2000 Today broadcast on 31 December 1999, a special Big Draw 2000 drawing was held to ring in the new millennium.

On 20 May 2006, during the draw on The National Lottery Jet Set that took place minutes before the Eurovision Song Contest 2006, several members of the group Fathers 4 Justice protested on the set causing the show to be taken off air for several minutes while the protesters were removed from the studio.

On 7 November 2015, live on BBC One, the Lotto draw machine failed to release all the balls, causing the draw to be postponed. The draw later took place off air, and the results were posted on the website.

Originally, the draws would take place in the BBC studio during the game show on Saturdays (and sometimes Wednesdays). However, since 23 September 2006, the channel airing the lottery draw has pre-recorded the non-draw parts of the show and then switched to National Lottery HQ for the live draws.

Wednesday draws at first had a 10-minute slot on BBC One, in the same set as the game show in the BBC studio, and presented by the same host. In later years the broadcast was hosted by various presenters in the National Lottery HQ studio; presenters included Gethin Jones, Christopher Biggins, John Barrowman, OJ Borg, Matt Johnson and Jenni Falconer. Alan Dedicoat provides the voice-over announcing the balls drawn, sometimes interacting with the presenter; he is known as The Voice Of the Balls. Charles Nove is the relief announcer.

As of 7 January 2012, there had been 1,678 draws – 784 Wednesday draws and 894 Saturday draws. In an initiative to spread BBC productions across the United Kingdom, all lottery shows were relocated to BBC Scotland.

From January 2013, the Tuesday, Wednesday and Friday draws were no longer broadcast, but could be viewed on the National Lottery's website; there was still a results update on BBC One at 10:45pm. On 24 November 2016, it was announced that the televised draws would be axed and moved to BBC iPlayer in January 2017. The last broadcast was on 31 December 2016.

On 12 April 2018, it was announced that the televised Saturday night draw would be aired on ITV in a 90-second slot with Stephen Mulhern as the new host.

National Lottery Xtra 
Between 10 March 2008 and 1 February 2010, the "National Lottery Xtra" channel was broadcast on Freeview channel 45 for one hour a day. Programming included content from winners of the jackpot and National Lottery Good Causes projects, as well as behind-the-scenes footage on how the National Lottery was operated.

Good causes 

In March 2022, it was announced that the UK national lottery raised £1.84 billion for good causes from March 2021 to March 2022 in a new yearly record.

By 2016, the National Lottery had raised about £35 billion for 'good causes', a programme which distributes money via grants. 25% of lottery revenue goes towards the fund, along with all unclaimed prizes. Additionally, 12% goes to the state. The prize fund is about 53% of revenue, with the remaining 10% going towards running costs and profits for the lottery organisers and ticket sellers.

The distribution of money to 'good causes' is not the responsibility of the operator (Camelot). It is the responsibility of the twelve distributors that make up The National Lottery Distribution Fund (NLDF), administered by the government Department for Culture, Media and Sport (which also sponsors the British Film Institute, which uses a portion of the National Lottery's funds to encourage film production). At present, 40% is awarded to health, education, environment and charitable causes, 20% to Sports, 20% to Arts and 20% to Heritage. On 19 November 2014, the National Lottery celebrated 20 years of its Good Causes fund, which as of 2014, has raised £32 billion for charities and projects in the UK. The National Lottery celebrated the 20th anniversary with the, 'Just Imagine' campaign which highlighted how the money has filtered through society to improve UK communities. Notable facts included that Good Causes had funded over 1300 elite athletes including Sir Chris Hoy, invested £43.5 million into the National Cycle Network and funded 12,700 after school clubs.

The Heritage Lottery Fund was set up by the government in 1994 to provide money for "projects involving the local, regional and national heritage". The funds come from the money raised by the National Lottery's 'Good Causes'. Since 1994, the Heritage Lottery Fund has given grants totalling approximately £4 billion to more than 26,000 projects.

In 2004, on the 10th anniversary of the National Lottery, the National Lottery Awards were instituted as an annual event to provide recognition of the work of Lottery funded projects around the UK.  Certain projects are selected as the best in particular categories. The trophies were designed and produced by Gaudio Awards.

Percentage return 
The National Lottery is a jackpot system with the majority of winnings going to those few players who pick all six numbers. The average percentage return is the share of the ticket sales devoted to prize funds, about 45% (i.e., 45% of the money spent on tickets would be won in prizes). The spread of returns will be very wide and influenced by several factors that change week-by-week (e.g. the number of tickets sold, the "distinctiveness" and popularity of the winning numbers). Over an extremely long period the return on investment would approach the average, about 45% (a 55% loss). Over a shorter period there is a very small chance of a big win, but otherwise an average return of less than 45%; a numerical experiment using 10,000 random sets of numbers each week between 1997 and 2001 found that, had the tickets been bought, the rate of return would have been 29%.

In their book Scenarios for Risk Management and Global Investment Strategies, academics Rachel E S Ziemba and William T Ziemba say with regard to 6/49 lotteries, "Random numbers have an expected loss of about 55%. However, six-tuples of unpopular numbers have an edge with expected returns exceeding their cost by about 65%. The expected value rises and approaches $2.25 per dollar wagered when there are carryovers [UK term: rollovers]. Random numbers, such as those from lucky dip and quick pick, and popular numbers are worth more with carryovers but never have an advantage." They conclude that, due to the time that would be required to achieve success, "except for millionaires and pooled syndicates, it is not possible to use the unpopular numbers in a scientific way to beat the lotto and have high confidence of becoming rich; these aspiring millionaires will also most likely be residing in a cemetery when their distant heirs reach the goal".

Unclaimed prizes 
Winning tickets must be claimed within 180 days of the draw taking place. If a prize is unclaimed within that time, it is distributed through the National Lottery Distribution Fund. For all major prizes (£50,000 and over) approximately two weeks after the draw, if no claim has been received, the geographical area in which the ticket was purchased is released to the public.

The highest unclaimed prize distributed this way to date was a winning ticket worth £63,837,543.60 which was bought in the Stevenage and Hitchin area for the Euromillions draw of 8 June 2012. This was a world record unclaimed prize. All investment income from unclaimed prizes also goes to good causes via the National Lottery Distribution Fund.

Regulation 
The National Lottery is regulated by the Gambling Commission. Previous regulators were the Office of the National Lottery until 1 April 1999, and the National Lottery Commission – a non-departmental public body reporting to the Department of Culture, Media and Sport – until 1 October 2013.

The Lottery was set up in 1993 under the National Lottery etc. Act 1993 and was reformed under the National Lottery Act 1998 and the National Lottery Act 2006.

The National Lottery is a member of the World Lottery Association.

Game shows

See also 
 National Lottery Community Fund
 Heritage Lottery Fund
 Millennium Commission
 National Health Service Lottery
 National Lottery (Ireland)
 The Health Lottery
 List of lotteries

References

External links 

 
 National Lottery Commission 

1994 establishments in the United Kingdom
Lotteries in the United Kingdom
Department for Digital, Culture, Media and Sport